"Head Over Heels" is a song recorded by Swedish pop group ABBA, released as a single the following year. The song is the second track from their eighth studio album, The Visitors.

History
"Head Over Heels", whose working title was "Tango", was written and composed by both Benny Andersson and Björn Ulvaeus. Agnetha Fältskog sang the lead vocals, singing about her "very good friend", played in the music video by Anni-Frid Lyngstad, an overactive high-society woman who rushes through the shops, with her hapless and exhausted husband (played by Ulvaeus) following behind and being forced to carry the shopping bags. The song's video, filmed on 21 January 1982, was the group's final clip directed by long-time collaborator Lasse Hallström, who cameos as a man the woman bumps into while running around the city.

As with the previous single "One of Us", Epic Records in the UK used a different picture sleeve from the standard one used in most countries.

The single itself was not released in the United States; it was accompanied as the B-side to another single "The Visitors" instead.

The sheet music has been released, and the song has been choreographed for dance numbers.

Reception
"Head Over Heels" was released as the group's popularity was starting to decline, and became ABBA's worst selling single since "I Do, I Do, I Do, I Do, I Do", seven years earlier. It peaked at number 25 on the UK Singles Chart, breaking a run of 18 consecutive Top 10 hits (from "SOS" in October 1975 to "One of Us" in December 1981). This 18-hit run had equaled that of The Beatles, who had consecutive Top 10 hits from 1964 (with "A Hard Day's Night") to 1966 (with "Yesterday"), broken by "Back in the U.S.S.R.". Although "Head Over Heels" did experience Top 10 success in Belgium, the Netherlands, Austria and France, by this time, ABBA's chart domination was all but over, and the group effectively disbanded a year later. The song was excluded from their retrospective double LP The Singles: The First Ten Years, which was released in late 1982.

Music video
ABBA filmed a video for Head Over Heels in Stockholm which was directed by Lasse Hallström. It is the group's only music video where the director makes an appearance; Hallström is the pedestrian who Frida bumps into on the street. The action in the video is taken directly from the text; where Frida portrays a woman who rushes through shops with her tired husband in tow (played by Ulvaeus).

Personnel
 Agnetha Fältskog – lead vocals
 Anni-Frid Lyngstad – backing vocals
 Björn Ulvaeus – guitar     
 Benny Andersson – keyboards, synthesizer

Charts

References

1981 songs
1982 singles
ABBA songs
Music videos directed by Lasse Hallström
Polar Music singles
Songs written by Benny Andersson and Björn Ulvaeus